Magnolia Plantation may refer to:

in the United States
(by state)
Magnolia Plantation, Florida
Magnolia Mound, St. Bernard, Louisiana, listed on the National Register of Historic Places (NRHP) in St. Bernard Parish 
Magnolia Mound Plantation House, Baton Rouge, Louisiana, NRHP-listed
Magnolia Mound Plantation Dependency, Baton Rouge, Louisiana, NRHP-listed in East Baton Rouge Parish
Magnolia Plantation (Derry, Louisiana), part of Cane River Creole National Historical Park, National Historic Landmark and NRHP-listed 
Magnolia Plantation (Plaquemines Parish, Louisiana), the home of Gen. Pierre "G.T." Beauregard and his first wife
Magnolia Plantation (Schriever, Louisiana), NRHP-listed 
Magnolia Lane Plantation, Westwego, Louisiana, listed on the National Register of Historic Places (NRHP).
Magnolia Plantation (Knoxville, Maryland), NRHP-listed
Magnolia Plantation, Mississippi
Magnolia Plantation and Gardens (Charleston, South Carolina), NRHP-listed

See also
Magnolia (disambiguation)
The Magnolias (disambiguation)
Magnolia Hall (disambiguation)
Magnolia Hill (disambiguation)
Magnolia Manor (disambiguation)